The 2002 PBA season was the 28th season of the Philippine Basketball Association (PBA).

Board of governors

Executive committee
 Emilio Bernardino, Jr. (Commissioner) 
 Francisco Alejo III (Chairman, representing Purefoods TJ Hotdogs)
 Casiano Cabalan Jr. (Vice-Chairman, representing Barangay Ginebra Kings)
 Angelito Alvarez (Treasurer, representing FedEx Express)

Teams

Notable occurrences
The league revised its season calendar to accommodate the participation of its players for the upcoming 2002 Asian Games. The Governors' Cup became the first conference of the season while the All-Filipino became the third and final conference.
The pool for the national team were divided into two teams: Selecta-RP and Hapee-RP. Both teams participated for the Governors' Cup. The teams were later merged to form the final lineup of the national team in the Commissioner's Cup, retaining the Selecta-RP branding.
Talk 'N Text coach Bill Bayno was fined PHP200,000 after publicly criticizing the league and its official. This came after Bayno branded the league as "San Miguel Basketball Association" and charged the league officials are favoring the four SMC-owned teams (San Miguel Beermen, Barangay Ginebra Kings, Coca Cola Tigers and Purefoods TJ Hotdogs).
This was the last season in which the Commissioner's and Governors Cup were disputed before the tournaments were reinstated in the 2010–11 season. They were replaced in 2003 by the Invitational and Reinforced Conferences in 2003, and eventually the Fiesta Conference in 2004 after the league reduced the number of conferences in a PBA season to two.

Opening ceremonies
The muses for the participating teams are as follows:

2002 PBA Governors' Cup

Elimination round

Playoffs

Finals 

|}

2002 PBA Commissioner's Cup

Elimination round

Playoffs

Finals 

|}

2002 PBA All-Filipino Cup

Elimination round

Playoffs

Finals 

|}

Awards
 Most Valuable Player: Willie Miller (Red Bull)
 Rookie of the Year:  Ren-Ren Ritualo (FedEx)
 Sportsmanship Award: Paolo Mendoza (Sta. Lucia)
 Most Improved Player: Rob Duat (Alaska)
 Defensive Player of the Year: Davonn Harp (Red Bull)
 Mythical Five
 Willie Miller (Red Bull)
 Davonn Harp (Red Bull)
 Jeffrey Cariaso (Coca-Cola)
 Victor Pablo (Talk 'N Text)
 Don Allado (Alaska)
 Mythical Second Team
 Asi Taulava (Talk 'N Text)
 Gilbert Demape (Talk 'N Text)
 Nic Belasco (San Miguel)
 Kerby Raymundo (Purefoods)
 Rey Evangelista (Purefoods)
 All Defensive Team
 Davonn Harp (Red Bull)
 Chris Jackson (Shell)
 Rudy Hatfield (Coca-Cola)
 Jeffrey Cariaso (Coca-Cola)
 Rey Evangelista (Purefoods)

Awards given by the PBA Press Corps
 Coach of the Year: Ryan Gregorio (Purefoods)
 Mr. Quality Minutes: Ato Morano (Coca-Cola)
 Executive of the Year: George C. Chua (Red Bull)
 Comeback Player of the Year: Ronnie Magsanoc (Purefoods)
 Referee of the Year: Mario Montiel

Cumulative standings

Elimination round

Playoffs

References

 
PBA